The Cahuenga Pass (Tongva: Kawé’nga), also known by its Spanish name Paseo de Cahuenga, is a low mountain pass through the eastern end of the Santa Monica Mountains in the Hollywood Hills district of the City of Los Angeles, California. The Cahuenga Pass connects the Los Angeles Basin to the San Fernando Valley via U.S. Route 101 (Hollywood Freeway) and Cahuenga Boulevard. It is the lowest pass through the mountains.

History
The name Cahuenga comes from a Tongva village named Kawé’nga, probably meaning "at the mountain".

It was the site of two major battles: the Battle of Cahuenga Pass in 1831 (a fight between local settlers and the Mexican-appointed governor and his men; two deaths), and the Battle of Providencia or Second Battle of Cahuenga Pass in 1845 (between locals over whether to secede from  Mexico; one horse and one mule killed). Both were on the San Fernando Valley side near present-day Studio City, and cannonballs are still occasionally found during excavations in the area. Along the route of the historic El Camino Real, the historic significance of the pass is also marked by a marker along Cahuenga Blvd. which names the area Paseo de Cahuenga.

See also
Campo de Cahuenga
Rancho Cahuenga
Cahuenga, California; Tongva settlement.

References

External links

Neighborhoods in Los Angeles
Mountain passes of California
U.S. Route 101
San Fernando Valley
Transportation in the San Fernando Valley
Santa Monica Mountains
El Camino Viejo
Hollywood Hills
Landforms of Los Angeles County, California